The 2013–14 Louisville Cardinals men's basketball team represented the University of Louisville during the 2013–14 NCAA Division I men's basketball season, Louisville's 100th season of intercollegiate competition. The Cardinals competed in the American Athletic Conference and were coached by Rick Pitino in his 13th season. The team played its home games on Denny Crum Court at the KFC Yum! Center.

They finished 31–6, 15–3 in AAC play to win the regular season conference championship, sharing the title with Cincinnati. They were also champions of the AAC tournament to earn the conferences automatic bid to the NCAA tournament. In their 40th NCAA tournament appearance, the defending national champions defeated Manhattan and Saint Louis to advance to the Sweet Sixteen where they lost to rival Kentucky.

This was their only season in the American Athletic Conference as they moved to the Atlantic Coast Conference on July 1, 2014.

Pre-season

The Cardinals were the #3 team in the USA Today Coaches preseason poll and picked to win American conference by the media and the coaches. The Cardinals returned 7 of 9 players from a team that won the 2013 NCAA Championship and both Big East regular season and tournament championships.  The team was led by its captains, Consensus First Team All-American Russ Smith, 2013 Final Four MOP Luke Hancock and Montrezl Harrell.

Departures

Class of 2013 signees

Roster

On January 10, 2014, Rick Pitino and Kevin Ware jointly announced that Ware would sit out the remainder of the season and take a medical redshirt. In Louisville's December 17 win over Missouri State, Ware was kicked in the same right leg he had severely fractured during the Cardinals' 2013 NCAA tournament win over Duke. Under NCAA rules, a player qualifies for a medical redshirt if he appears in fewer than 30 percent of his team's games, with no appearances in the second half of the season. Ware played in nine out of a total of 31 scheduled games; the Missouri State game was Louisville's 11th of the season. Shortly after the Cardinals' exit from the NCAA tournament, Ware announced that he would transfer from Louisville. On April 12, Ware confirmed to ESPN.com that his destination would be Georgia State, near his family's current Atlanta-area home.

Regular season

Out of conference

Louisville opened with two exhibition victories and 2 wins at home. They played in the Hall of Fame Classic, advancing to the finals where they fell to #24 North Carolina 93-84. They finished out their non-conference slate with 5 victories, including a 79-63 win over Western Kentucky in the Billy Minardi Classic, and a loss at Rupp Arena to archrival #18 Kentucky. They entered American Athletic Conference play with an 11–2 record.

Departures

American Athletic

The Cardinals opened American Athletic play with road victories over UCF and Rutgers before returning home and losing to #24 Memphis. They then went 11-1 in their next 12 games, splitting a home and home with Cincinnati. They lost their second game with Memphis before closing out the season with back to back victories over #18 SMU and #19 UConn on senior day. They finished the regular season with a 26–5 (15–3) record and finished in a tie with Cincinnati as American Athletic Regular Season Champions.

Russ Smith was named to the Sporting News, Sport Illustrated and NBC Sports All-American First Teams. Russ Smith and Montrezl Harrell were named to the American Athletic Conference All-Conference First Team, and Terry Rozier was named to the American Athletic Conference All-Rookie Team.

Post-season

American Athletic Tournament
By virtue of losing a coin flip the Cardinals were the #2 seed in the tournament and faced Rutgers in the quarterfinal round. They set an AAC record for margin of victory with a 61-point defeat of the Scarlet Knights, 92-31. They defeated Houston in the semi-finals 94-65. Russ Smith set an AAC scoring record and Louisville tournament scoring record with 42 points against the Cougars. The Cardinals won the AAC tournament championship game against #21 UConn by the score of 71-61. This was the Cardinals first AAC tournament championship, in their only year in the conference. Russ Smith won the AAC tournament Most Outstanding player award. Smith, Montrezl Harrell and Luke Hancock were named to the AAC All-tournament First Team.

The Cardinals have won three consecutive conference tournament championships (two in the Big East and one in the AAC).

NCAA tournament
The Cardinals earned a #4 seed in the Midwest region and defeated Manhattan in the second round by a score of 71-64. They defeated #5 seed St. Louis in the third round, but their reign as defending champs ended when the Cardinals were dethroned by #8 Kentucky 74-69 in the Sweet 16, finishing 31-6.

Schedule

|-
! colspan="12" style="background:#ad0000; color:#fff;"| Exhibition

|-
! colspan="12" style="background:#ad0000; color:#fff;"| Regular season

|-
! colspan="12" style="background:#ad0000; color:#fff;"| American Athletic Conference tournament

|-
! colspan="12" style="background:#ad0000; color:#fff;"| NCAA tournament

Rankings

Awards
AP First Team All-American 
Russ Smith
USBWA First Team All-America 
Russ Smith
Sporting News First Team All-America 
Russ Smith
NABC Second Team All-America
Russ Smith 
John R. Wooden Award All-American 
Russ Smith
NBC Sports First Team All-America 
Russ Smith
Sports Illustrated First Team All-America 
Russ Smith
Frances Pomeroy Naismith Award (top Division I senior 6'0"/1.83 m or shorter)
Russ Smith
USBWA District IV Player of the Year 
Russ Smith
American Athletic Conference All-Conference First Team
Russ Smith
Montrezl Harrell
American Athletic Conference All-Rookie Team
Terry Rozier
USBWA District IV All-District Team
Russ Smith
Montrezl Harrell

Notable achievements

Luke Hancock scored the 1000th point of his college career (at George Mason and Louisville) in a 113-74 victory over LA-Lafayette on December 7, 2013. 
The team set the KFC YUM! Center single game scoring record with a 113-74 victory over LA-Lafayette on December 7, 2013.
Montrezl Harrell broke the single season record for dunks that was previously held by Pervis Ellison.
Russ Smith set the school record for most points in a half previously held by Larry O'Bannon, Charlie Tyra and Butch Beard (26) with 27 in the first half against Houston on 3-14-14.
Russ Smith set the school record for most points in a conference tournament game with 42 against Houston on 3-14-14. The previous record was 31 by Milt Wagner.
Russ Smith set the AAC record for most points in a game with 42 against Houston on 3-14-14.
Russ Smith broke the school record for most steals in a career with 257, previously held by Peyton Siva (254).
Russ Smith broke the school record for most career points in the NCAA tournament, breaking a record previously held by Milt Wagner.

References

Louisville
Louisville Cardinals men's basketball seasons
Louisville
Louisville Cardinals men's basketball, 2013-14
Louisville Cardinals men's basketball, 2013-14